Look Stop Listen (listed on label as Look Stop and Listen) is an album by drummer Philly Joe Jones' Dameronia which was recorded and released on the Uptown label in 1983.

Reception

The AllMusic review by Scott Yanow said the album was "Highly recommended".

Track listing
All compositions by Tadd Dameron except where noted
 "Look, Stop and Listen" – 5:52
 "If You Could See Me Now" – 5:34
 "Choose Now" – 5:30
 "Focus" – 5:49
 "Killer Joe" (Benny Golson) – 6:08
 "Dial B for Beauty" – 5:05
 "Our Delight" – 4:27
 "Theme of No Repeat" – 5:52
 "If You Could See Me Now" [1st Take] – 5:41 Additional track on CD release
 "Look, Stop and Listen" [1st Take] – 5:12 Additional track on CD release

Personnel
Philly Joe Jones – drums
Johnny Griffin - tenor saxophone (tracks 1, 2, 5 & 8-10)
Don Sickler – trumpet, tenor saxophone, director
Virgil Jones – trumpet 
Benny Powell – trombone
Frank Wess – alto saxophone, flute
Charles Davis – tenor saxophone, flute
Cecil Payne – baritone saxophone
Walter Davis Jr. – piano
Larry Ridley – double bass

References

Uptown Records (jazz) albums
Philly Joe Jones albums
Dameronia albums
1983 albums
Albums recorded at Van Gelder Studio